James Farrow may refer to:
 James Farrow (politician)
 James Farrow (trader)